Winsom (born 1946) is a Canadian-Jamaican Maroon multi-media artist working in textiles, painting, video, installations, and puppetry. Her work explores human spirituality.

Biography 
Winsom was born in 1946 in Jamaica, where she studied at the Jamaica School of Art. She immigrated to Canada in 1969. From 1974 to 1989, she lived in the city of Kingston, Ontario and she co-founded the Kingston's Black Women's Collective.

Exhibitions 
Winsom has been exhibiting her work since the mid-1980s at galleries around the world. Her work was featured in the group exhibition, "Black Wimmin: When and Where We Enter" (1989), organized by the Diasporic Africa Women's Art Collective (DAWA), which toured in Canada. She has held solo exhibitions at the Art Gallery of Ontario and the National Gallery of the Cayman Islands. In 2003, Winsom had four exhibitions running concurrently in Toronto galleries. 

Winsom's work was featured in the 2017 group exhibition Toronto: Tributes + Tributaries, 1971-1989 at the Art Gallery of Ontario, curated by Wanda Nanibush.

In 2018 to 2019, the Art Gallery of Ontario presented a solo show of her work, curated by  Andrea Fatona, entitled “I Rise”. It was in this context that Winsom partook in a performative dinner with the Black Wimmin Artists (BWA) collective called The Feast in 2019. Her installation titled "The Masks We Wear" was exhibited at the Agnes Etherington Art Centre in 2022.

Awards and Honors 
NOW Magazine described Winsom as "the defining artist of Black History Month in Toronto".

In 2015, she was the recipient of an Honorary Doctorate from OCAD University.

References

External links 

 

1946 births
Living people
Artists from Toronto
20th-century Canadian artists
20th-century Canadian women artists
21st-century Canadian artists
21st-century Canadian women artists
Jamaican emigrants to Canada